Tom Warner (born 1952) is an author, gay rights activist, and former Human Rights Commissioner. He was born in Saskatchewan and lives in Toronto, Ontario. He was one of the founding members of Gay Students' Alliance at the University of Saskatchewan, and of the Zodiac Friendship Society. In Toronto, he helped found the Gay Alliance Toward Equality and has been involved with the Right to Privacy Committee. From 1993 to 1996 he served as an Ontario Human Rights Commissioner.

Honours and awards 
The ArQuives: Canada's LGBTQ2+ Archives National Portrait Collection. Inducted in 2002.

Books 
Never Going Back: A History of Queer Activism in Canada. Toronto: University of Toronto Press, 2002. .

References 

1952 births
Living people
Activists from Saskatchewan
Activists from Toronto
Canadian LGBT rights activists
Canadian gay writers
Writers from Saskatchewan
Writers from Toronto
Canadian non-fiction writers
Canadian male non-fiction writers